The Importation Act 1455 (33 Henry VI c. 5) was an act of the Parliament of England passed during the reign of Henry VI.

In 1455, London silkwomen complained that the Lombards were importing "ribbands and chains, falsely and deceitfully wrought, all manner girdles and other things concerning the said mistery and occupation, in no manner wise bringing in any good silk unwrought as they were wont to bring heretofore". Parliament therefore passed the Importation Act 1455 prohibiting the importation of these goods, with punishments of forfeiture and considerable fines.

Notes

Acts of the Parliament of England
1450s in law
1455 in England
Protectionism